Caldes d'Estrac (also known as Caldetes) is a municipality in the comarca of  Maresme in Catalonia, Spain. It is situated on the coast between Sant Vicenç de Montalt and Arenys de Mar. It is served by the main N-II road along the coast and by a station on the RENFE railway line.

Caldes d'Estrac was a fashionable spa town for the Barcelona bourgeoisie between 1875 and the 1920s for its thermal baths and beachside atmosphere. The massive flyover road built in the 1960s and the building of suburban residences in the 1990s did away with much of the quiet of the town.

Climate

References

Sources
 Panareda Clopés, Josep Maria; Rios Calvet, Jaume; Rabella Vives, Josep Maria (1989). Guia de Catalunya, Barcelona: Caixa de Catalunya.  (Spanish).  (Catalan).

External links 
Official website 
 Government data pages 

Municipalities in Maresme
Spa towns in Catalonia
Populated places in Maresme